This is a list of notable film and television directors from Hungary.

Although listed in Western-, native names follow the Eastern name order.

For an alphabetical list of articles on Hungarian actors see :Category:Hungarian film directors.

A
Nimród Antal

B
 Béla Balogh
 Gábor Bódy
 Géza von Bolváry
 István Bujtor
 László Benedek
 Péter Bacsó
 Zoltán Bonta

C
 Ferenc Cakó

D
 Alfréd Deésy
 Attila Dargay

E
 Ildikó Enyedi
 Judit Elek

F
 Nicolas Farkas
 Benedek Fliegauf
 György Fehér
 Péter Forgács
 Zoltán Fábri
 Paul Fejos

G
 István Gaál
 Péter Gothár
 Lívia Gyarmathy
 Imre Gyöngyössy
 Gábor N. Forgács

H
 János Herskó
 Zoltán Huszárik

J
 Jenő Janovics
 Marcell Jankovics
 Miklós Jancsó

K
 Alexander Korda
 Barna Kabay
 Ferenc Kardos
 Ferenc Kósa
 Ferenc Kósa
 Ilona Kolonits
 Márton Keleti
 Róbert Koltai
 Zsolt Kézdi-Kovács

M
 Félix Máriássy
 Gyula Maár
 Károly Makk
 Márta Mészáros
 Peter Medak

P
 György Pálfi

R
 Géza von Radványi
 László Ranódy
 Sándor Reisenbüchler
 Miklós Rózsa

S
 István Szabó
 János Szász
 Pál Sándor
 István Székely
 Sándor Sára
 Zoltan Szalkai

T
Béla Tarr
Ivan Tors
Ferenc Török

V
Péter Vácz

See also
List of film directors by name

 
Lists of film directors by nationality
Film directors